John Nixon Sylvester (June 8, 1909 – February 1, 1993) was an American politician in the state of Washington. He served in the Washington House of Representatives from 1937 to 1941. He was Speaker of the House from 1939 to 1941.

References

1993 deaths
1909 births
Democratic Party members of the Washington House of Representatives
20th-century American politicians